Bizarre Fruit II is a reissued and expanded version of M People's 1994 Bizarre Fruit album, with the single versions of "Search for the Hero" and "Love Rendezvous" in place of the originals, and including the band's cover of the Small Faces' "Itchycoo Park". It was initially released as a limited edition with a bonus Live and Remixed CD or cassette. The Live and Remixed disc contains live versions of tracks from Bizarre Fruit and M People's previous two albums, Northern Soul and Elegant Slumming. The live tracks were recorded at GMEX in Manchester on 16 December 1994, except "Search for the Hero" which was recorded at Grosse Freiheit in Hamburg on 26 February 1995.

Bizarre Fruit II was later released as a single CD replacing the original Bizarre Fruit album. Confusingly, later editions of this single-disc version bear the title Bizarre Fruit, although the cover art remains the same as the initial Bizarre Fruit II release.

Critical reception
Pan-European magazine Music & Media wrote, "The British have a way with mixing dance, funk and soul elements into brand new styles. Like Tricky and Massive Attack, M People have developed their own thang, which is based on stark electronic rhythms and the gloriously soulful vocals of Heather Small. M People have successfully put their hands on the Small Faces' Itchycoo Park, currently a new entry in the EHR Top 40, but they certainly don't shy away from disco-inspired basslines and rhythm guitars."

Track listing

Release history

References

1995 albums
M People albums
Reissue albums